Aplastodiscus sibilatus is a species of frog in the family Hylidae. It is endemic to northeastern Brazil and is known from central-eastern Bahia and Alagoas. The specific name sibilatus is derived from the Latin sibilus meaning "whistle", in allusion to the characteristic call of the species.

Description
Adult males measure  in snout–vent length. The overall appearance is slender. The head is slightly longer than it is wide. The snout is obtuse in lateral view and slightly tapering in dorsal view. The tympanum is distinct, but its upper edge is covered by the well-developed supratympanic fold. The fingers and the toes bear adhesive discs at their tips and have well-developed webbing. Dorsal surfaces are green with numerous black dots and few white dots posteriorly, without forming a clear pattern. The gular region and chest are bluish-green. The belly is white.

Habitat and conservation
Males call from bromeliads. Breeding takes place in the slow backwaters of fast-flowing streams. This species is probably threatened by habitat loss caused by agricultural development, logging, and infrastructure development. It is not known to occur in protected areas.

References

sibilatus
Frogs of South America
Amphibians of Brazil
Endemic fauna of Brazil
Amphibians described in 2003
Taxonomy articles created by Polbot